Copnall is a surname. Notable people with the surname include:

Edward Bainbridge Copnall (1903–1973), British sculptor and painter
Jenny Copnall (born 1975), English cyclist
John Copnall (1928–2007), English artist
Teresa Copnall (1882–1972), British painter